Royal Air Force Valley or more simply RAF Valley  is a Royal Air Force station on the island of Anglesey, Wales, and which is also used as Anglesey Airport. It provides both basic and advanced fast-jet training using the Texan T1 and Hawk T2 and provides mountain and maritime training for aircrew using the Jupiter T1 helicopter.

History

World War Two
The airfield was constructed in the latter part of 1940 and opened for operations on 1 February 1941 as a Fighter Sector Station under No. 9 Group RAF with the task of providing defence cover for England's industrial north-west and shipping in the Irish Sea. Initial detachments were made by Hawker Hurricanes of 312 and 615 Squadrons. A detachment of Bristol Beaufighters of 219 Squadron provided night fighter cover.

No. 456 Squadron Royal Australian Air Force (RAAF) formed at Valley on 30 June 1941 and became operational on 5 September flying Boulton Paul Defiants. By November the squadron had completely re-equipped with Beaufighter IIs, and these provided defensive night patrols over the Irish Sea until March 1943, when the unit moved away.

As a result of many accidents in the Irish Sea, due to the number of training aircraft active in the area, 275 Squadron formed at Valley in October 1941, equipped with Westland Lysanders and Supermarine Walrus amphibians and these performed Air-sea rescue (ASR) missions until the unit moved away in April 1944.

The runways and taxiways were extended in early 1943 and on 19 June 1943 the United States Army Air Forces (USAAF) Ferry Terminal became operational. This handled American aircraft arriving from transatlantic flights and on European sorties. Eleven Liberators of the United States Navy arrived from Iceland on 17 August. During the winter of 1943/1944, the ferry route was switched to a southerly route via the Azores and Marrakesh and on 18 February, 62 Douglas C-47s arrived from North Africa. One of Valley's busiest days was on 17 September 1944 when 99 USAAF Boeing B-17s and Liberators were ferried in from Iceland. In the middle of 1944 there was a daily transatlantic Douglas C-54 Skymaster service from Stephenville bringing airmen of all ranks, who continued their journeys to London by travelling on the LMSR Irish Mail train from Holyhead.

Because of the large scale USAAF activities at Valley, RAF operations were scaled down, but on 1 November 1944, No. 1528 BAT Flight re-formed here operating Airspeed Oxford twin-engined aircraft which were used in the Beam Approach training role until moving out on 17 December 1945.

RAF Valley's USAAF ferry role was reversed as soon as the European War ended and over 2,600 bombers passed through on their way back to the US for re-deployment, each carrying 20 passengers and crew. The USAAF Movement Section closed in September 1945, and in June 1947 the airfield was put on a care and maintenance basis.

Postwar operations
During 1950 many improvements were made to the hangars and buildings at Valley and on 1 April 1951 No. 202 Advanced Flying School was reformed here in No. 25 Group to train fighter pilots on Vampire and Meteor jet aircraft.  Vampire FB.5 and T.11 and Meteor T.7 marks were used until the unit was re-designated No. 7 Flying Training School (FTS) on 1 June 1954. On 15 August 1960 the unit was renumbered No. 4 Flying Training School RAF which is still based at the airfield.

The first Folland Gnat jet trainers were received on 7 November 1962 and many examples of the type were successfully operated for many years. These were supplemented by Hawker Hunters for advanced training, marks F.6 and T.7 being used. The first BAE Hawks arrived on 11 November 1976 and this type is still in use by 4 FTS.

RAF Valley previously hosted the Headquarters and 'C Flight' of No. 22 Squadron, part of the RAF's Search and Rescue Force. By October 2015, the RAF SAR Force had been relieved of their responsibility by a new contractor-led operation, run by Bristow Helicopters, and the nearest SAR unit is now based at Caernarfon Airport. The RAF Operational Conversion Unit, 203(R) Squadron, was also based at Valley to train new aircrew onto the Westland Sea King HAR.3/3A, and prepare them for their SAR operations. The Duke of Cambridge, second-in-line to the British Throne, was assigned to C Flight, 22 Squadron at RAF Valley, as a pilot flying the Sea King search and rescue helicopter.  He finished his last shift as a pilot on Tuesday 10 September 2013.

No. 208(R) Squadron, which provided legacy Hawk T1 advanced flying training and tactical weapons training disbanded in June 2016.

In September 2017, a project to upgrade the airfield was completed. The project involved resurfacing of the runway and link taxiways and the creation of a new section of airside perimeter road. New visual aids, aeronautical lighting and signage were installed. A hangar was refurbished to accommodate three Jupiter HT1 helicopters which will be used to train pilots from all three British armed services, as part of the UK Military Flying Training System (UKMFTS). On 20 March 2018 a BAE Systems Hawk of the Red Arrows aerobatic team crashed, killing Corporal Jonathan Bayliss, an engineer. The pilot, Flight Lieutenant David Stark, survived and was treated in hospital for non-life-threatening injuries.Due to increased demand for RAF and Royal Navy pilots, No. 25 Squadron reformed at Valley on 8 September 2018. The squadron operates the Hawk T2 alongside No. 4 Squadron as part of No. 4 Flying Training School.

On 28 November 2019, No. 72 Squadron was officially 'stood up' at RAF Valley, flying the Beechcraft Textron Texan T1 aircraft in the basic flying training role. The squadron transitioned from Tucano (RAF Linton-on-Ouse) to Texan (RAF Valley) in a major investment by the UK Military Flying Training System. The squadron operates a fleet of 10 Texan T1's, meaning that RAF Valley is now home to two-thirds of fast jet training, delivering both basic and advanced courses.

In May 2020, Virginia Crosbie, MP for Ynys Môn and members of Senedd wrote to the Ministry of Defence (MoD) seeking assurance that travel to and from the base was limited to critical journeys during the COVID-19 pandemic. The MoD told the Local Democracy Reporting Service that training remained under "constant review".

On 25 May 2020 a Pilatus PC-12 landed at RAF Valley while the base was closed for maintenance work. Initially staff thought it was an emergency landing, but the pilot said he landed there "to go to the beach". When told about the lockdown and coronavirus restrictions he was reported to have replied "it was okay, because he had [the virus] two months ago". He had flown from Fairoaks Airport and had noticed RAF Valley on Google Earth and decided to land there as Wikipedia said it served civilian traffic. He left shortly after landing. The Ministry of Defence said that while civilian traffic were allowed at its sites, 24 hours notice is required to make sure it does not impact military activity. The incident was reported to the Civil Aviation Authority.

Role and operations 

No. 4 Flying Training School (No. 4 FTS) trains RAF and Royal Navy pilots to fly fast jets, prior to training on an Operational Conversion Unit. No. 4 FTS consist of three units, No. 72 Squadron, No. 4 Squadron and No. 25 Squadron, flying the Texan T1 and BAE Hawk T2.

The base is also home to No. 202 Squadron, part of No.1 Flying Training School, flying three Airbus Jupiter HT1. The squadron trains RAF and Royal Navy students on maritime and mountain flying training and those who are destined for the Royal Navy's anti-submarine warfare Merlin or Wildcat.

Based units
Flying and notable non-flying units based at RAF Valley.

No. 22 Group RAF
No. 4 Flying Training School
Headquarters No. 4 Flying School
No. 4 Squadron – BAE Hawk T2
No. 25 Squadron – BAE Hawk T2
No. 72 Squadron – Beechcraft Texan T.1
No.1 Flying Training School
No. 202 Squadron – Airbus Jupiter HT1

No. 38 Group (Air Combat Service Support) RAF
 No. 85 (Expeditionary Logistics) Wing
 RAF Mountain Rescue Service
 Headquarters RAF Mountain Rescue Service
 RAF Valley Mountain Rescue Team

Civilian airport

The National Assembly for Wales announced on 21 February 2007 that public service obligation (PSO) flights would be launched from RAF Valley in April 2007, connecting north Wales with Cardiff International Airport. Flights from RAF Valley to Cardiff stopped after the first set of government Covid-19 pandemic restrictions in March 2020. On the 8th June 2022, the Welsh Government axed the service - leaving the purpose built civilian airport terminal disused.

See also 

 List of Royal Air Force stations

References

Citations

Bibliography

External links 

 
 UK Military Aeronautical Information Publication – Valley (EGOV)

1941 establishments in the United Kingdom
Military airbases established in 1941
Buildings and structures in Anglesey
Royal Air Force stations in Wales
Royal Air Force stations of World War II in the United Kingdom
Llanfair-yn-Neubwll